TWA Flight 800 may refer to:

 TWA Flight 800 (1964), which crashed in Italy on 24 November 1964 due to an engine failure
 TWA Flight 800 (1996), which crashed over New York on 17 July 1996 due to a fuel tank explosion
 TWA Flight 800 (film), a documentary based on the 1996 crash

Flight number disambiguation pages